These are the full results of the 2008 European Cup Super League which was held on 21 and 22 June 2008 at the Parc des Sports in Annecy, France.

Final standings

Men

Women

Men's results

100 metres
June 21Wind: -1.8 m/s

200 metres
June 22Wind: -0.3 m/s

400 metres
June 21

800 metres
June 22

1500 metres
June 21

3000 metres
June 22

5000 metres
June 21

110 metres hurdles
June 22Wind: -0.6 m/s

400 metres hurdles
June 21

3000 metres steeplechase
June 22

4 × 100 metres relay 
June 21

4 × 400 metres relay 
June 22

High jump
June 21

Pole vault
June 22

Long jump
June 21

Triple jump
June 22

Shot put
June 21

Discus throw
June 22

Hammer throw
June 21

Javelin throw
June 22

Women's results

100 metres
June 21Wind: +1.3 m/s

200 metres
June 22Wind: -0.2 m/s

400 metres
June 21

800 metres
June 21

1500 metres
June 22

3000 metres
June 21

5000 metres
June 22

100 metres hurdles
June 22Wind: -1.3 m/s

400 metres hurdles
June 21

3000 metres steeplechase
June 21

4 × 100 metres relay 
June 21

4 × 400 metres relay 
June 22

High jump
June 22

Pole vault
June 21

Long jump
June 22

Triple jump
June 21

Shot put
June 22

Discus throw
June 21

Hammer throw
June 22

Javelin throw
June 21

References

European Cup Super League
European
European Cup Super League
European Cup Super League
International athletics competitions hosted by France
Sport in Annecy